The Hayfield School is a secondary school in Auckley, Doncaster, in  the county  of South Yorkshire, England. As of 2010, it teaches around 1100 pupils of 11–16 years of age. It has specialist statuses in Mathematics and Computing (gained in 2004) and also in Languages (gained in 2008). It is also a training school and registered in 2010 to become an academy.

History
The school opened in 1971, with Tony Storey OBE as headmaster. In 1990 school finances came under control of the governors and the school. Further independence was gained in 1995: Grant Maintained Status with the Governors becoming 'owners' of the site and buildings, and employers for all staff. Some of these authorities were lost in 1999 as the school became a foundation school.

In 2008, Tony Storey, Britain's longest serving headmaster, retired after 37 years of service (for which he received an OBE)

and was succeeded by Sai Patel.
In March 2012 Patel was suspended by the school governors.
Maria Rock stood in as acting headmistress during Patel's absence.
In the summer term of 2012 it was announced to parents and students that Patel would not be returning to the Hayfield School, and on 29 October 2012 Rock was made headmistress. On 13 April 2015 Fox was made headmistress as Rock retired in Easter.

The Hayfield School closed its sixth form in August 2017 due to changes in funding. NEW College, Pontefract opened NEW College, Doncaster on The Hayfield School site in a new building which opened in September 2017, accommodating 1200 sixth form students.

School site
Construction of the original school building began in 1969 on a greenfield site in a rural suburban setting. It is square-shaped but contains two courtyards. There is a field behind the building used by the school that is one kilometre in perimeter. Additionally there are floodlit AstroTurf (polymeric surfaced), and concrete courts owned by the school but managed by Hayfield Community Sports Centre. The facilities are utilised by both the school and the community of Auckley. A new block with specialised science classrooms was added to the school in 2003. On 5 December 2013 sections of the school roof blew off during high winds leading to a temporary roof being installed to enable the school to reopen in January 2014.

Curriculum
The school's curriculum includes a compulsory modern foreign language (primarily German or French), and optional triple science at GCSE level. In 2009 the school received a Grade 2 Ofsted rating.

Notable alumni
 Steven Judge, twice World Champion in Paratriathlon, at the 2011 ITU World Championship Series in Beijing and the 2012 ITU World Triathlon Series in Auckland, competing in the TRI 3 category.
Louis Tomlinson, singer, songwriter and former band member of One Direction

References

External links
 The Hayfield School
 Hayfield School Ofsted profile

Academies in Doncaster
Secondary schools in Doncaster
Educational institutions established in 1971
1971 establishments in England
Auckley